Potentilla nepalensis, common name Nepal cinquefoil, is a perennial plant species in the genus Potentilla.

Description
This plant forms low mounds of deep green strawberry-like leaves composed of broad leaflets. The cup-shaped 5-petalled flowers may be cherry red or deep pink, with a darker center, about 2.5 cm in width. They bloom July to August.

Distribution
This plant is native to E. Asia and W. Himalayas, from Pakistan to Nepal.

Habitat

References

nepalensis